The O'Davoren family were a scholarly clan of Corcomroe, Thomond (modern-day County Clare), Ireland active since medieval times.

Famed for their sponsorship of schools and knowledge of history and Early Irish law, the Uí Dhuibh dá Bhoireann were known throughout Ireland as a literary family and held estates in the Burren down to the mid seventeenth century at the time of the Cromwellian confiscations.  Many acted as brehons for the local ruling dynasty of Uí Loughlin from the 14th century or earlier.

Origins

The O'Davorens, like the O'Hehirs and some other septs west of the Shannon in County Clare Ireland, belonged to the Eoghanacht stock claiming name and descent from the son of Aengus, King of Cashel, slain 957. The family settled in Burren in mediaeval times, exact date unknown. We first hear of them as hereditary ollamhs to the O'Loghlens of that district, who are of the race of Fergus mac Roigh, of Ulster. The earliest reference to them in print is in the Annals of the Four Masters under the year 1364, where the death of Giolla na Naomh Ó Duibh dá Bhoireann, ollamh of Corcomdhruadh in Brehon law, is recorded.

Excavation
The O'Davoren law school at Cahermacnaghten has been the subject of archaeological and historical interest and its remains are still extant. The law school operated in the sixteenth and seventeenth century, with a Giolla na Naomh Óg Ó Duibh dá Bhoireann being recorded as one of its chief owners in the seventeenth century. The O'Davorens's were recorded as still holding Cahermacnaghten in 1659, along with 13 Irish tenants.

Literary production

The most important surviving document associated with them is known as Egerton 88 (British Library), being compiled between 1564 and 1569. It contains copies of some important texts of Early Irish law, in addition to a number of Old Irish literary tales.

References

Oxford Concise Companion to Irish Literature, Robert Welsh, 1996.

External links
 http://www.nuigalway.ie/archaeology/documents/fitzpatrick_report_on_burren_field_school_for_celt.pdf
 Síaburcharpat Conculaind (The Phantom Chariot of Cúchulainn) from Egerton 88 at CELT
 http://www.clarelibrary.ie/eolas/coclare/places/townlands/cahermacnaghten.htm
 https://web.archive.org/web/20150712072310/http://www.heritagecouncil.ie/fileadmin/user_upload/INSTAR_Database/Burren_Landscape_and_Settlement_Final_Report_08.pdf

Anglicised Irish-language surnames
Irish writers
Irish families
Irish Brehon families
Families of Irish ancestry